Manchester Council may refer to:

Manchester City Council, the local government authority for the city of Manchester, UK
Greater Manchester County Council, the top-tier local government administrative body for Greater Manchester from 1974 to 1986
Manchester Council (New Hampshire), division of the Boy Scouts of America serving New Hampshire